FC Kolos Krasnodar was a Russian football team from Krasnodar. It played professionally from 1992 to 1996, including two seasons (1993 and 1995) in the second-highest Russian First Division.

Reserve squad
Kolos's reserve squad played professionally as FC Kolos-2 Krasnodar (Russian Second League in 1993 and Russian Third League in 1994) and as FC Kolos-d Krasnodar in the Russian Third League in 1995.

External links
  Team history at KLISF

Association football clubs established in 1992
Association football clubs disestablished in 1996
Kolos
1992 establishments in Russia
1996 disestablishments in Russia